Vitelleschi is a surname. Notable people with the surname include:

 Giovanni Vitelleschi (1396–1440), Italian cardinal and condottiere
 Mutio Vitelleschi (1563–1645), sixth Superior General of the Society of Jesus
 Sulpizia Vitelleschi (1635–1684), Italian heiress

Surnames of Italian origin